Lobotomy Corporation is an indie horror strategy management simulation video game for Microsoft Windows developed and published by South Korean studio Project Moon in April 2018. The sequel, deck-building game Library of Ruina, was released for Windows and Xbox One in August 2021. The third installment, dungeon role-playing game Limbus Company has been released in February 2023.

Premise
The Player, who is referred as "X", is the manager of a renewable underground power company called "Lobotomy Corporation" that harvests energy from strange beings and objects known as "Abnormalities". They are tasked with overseeing the process and must command their employees to "work" on these Abnormalities in order to fill the daily "quota" of energy, but must also suppress them in order to place them back in their containment if they breach.

The premise is inspired by the SCP Foundation, a collaborative web fiction project about a secret organization that contains supernatural "anomalies" in research facilities. Other inspirations include television series Warehouse 13 and horror-comedy film The Cabin in the Woods.

Gameplay
The game is divided into two different phases: preparation and management (the latter of which is the "meat" of the game). In the preparation phase, the player can hire new employees, boost existing employees' stats (Fortitude, Prudence, Temperance, and Justice), assign them to different departments, and equip them with E.G.O weapons and suits, some of which are basic while others have special quirks. Next, the management phase consists of sending these employees to extract energy from Abnormalities. The success of this process can vary wildly depending on the circumstances of the work and the employee's skill, as each Abnormality has its unique set of traits that determine how it will behave and what dangers it poses. Information about these traits is unavailable initially, and the player must discover them through trial and error by earning information points through the aforementioned work process. Information points can be used to learn specific traits of the Abnormality, such as work preferences, breach behavior, and the ability to create E.G.O equipment based on the abnormalities.

Once enough energy is collected, the player can end the day and have their performance rated from S (the best) to F (the worst). This rating determines how many LOB points the player will receive as a reward. LOB points can be used to promote existing employees or hire new ones. The performance rating is influenced by how many employees survived the day, while a penalty is applied based on the danger levels of the Abnormalities that breached during the day. Should the player decide to continue, they will (usually) be forced to choose new Abnormalities out of a selection of three. The only information given about the selectable Abnormalities is their classification numbers and a small amount of flavor text. Once an Abnormality is chosen, it is added with the rest and the preparation phase begins again. As each day passes, the game will select more difficult Abnormalities for the player to choose from.

Characters
The player of the game is first guided through the game by their assistant, Angela, who is an advanced AI created by the company. The player is eventually also guided by characters called Sefirot, who lead various departments of the facility. The facility is based on an upside-down Kabbalah, with each Sefirot's names corresponding to where their department is located. There are several different abnormalities ranging in danger levels. The danger levels are based on letters of the Hebrew alphabet.
 ZAYIN: The least dangerous abnormalities are categorized here. These abnormalities can produce positive effects for the player and will not breach.
 TETH: The second least dangerous abnormalities, and the first danger level that can breach containment. These are usually not dangerous but may catch players off-guard.
 HE: Here, abnormalities may become difficult for players to overcome if unprepared. They are of average danger.
 WAW: At this level, abnormalities are more gimmick-based, which must be followed to keep them contained. These are capable of wiping out employees fairly easily.
 ALEPH: The highest danger level, but also the most rewarding to work on. Abnormalities featured here in this category are capable of single-handedly destroying facilities.
The player will always start out with a ZAYIN-class abnormality named "One Sin and Hundreds of Good Deeds", who is based on both Jesus Christ and Judas Iscariot. His name refers to Judas' "one sin" of betraying Jesus, and his "hundreds of good deeds" he must do as payment for committing the sin. One Sin appears as a skull embedded in an iron cross, wearing a crown of thorns. After this, the abnormalities will be drawn randomly for the player to manage.

References

2018 video games
Construction and management simulation games
Video games developed in South Korea
Windows games
SCP Foundation